Q Line may refer to:

QLine, a streetcar system in Detroit, Michigan
Q-line, an IRCd configuration
Q Line, or Q, a New York City Subway line